Richa Bhadra is an Indian actress who has worked for Hats Off Productions. She is best known by her role as Mitali Thakkar in the comedy television drama Baa Bahoo Aur Baby, and as Chakki Parekh also in the comedy television drama Khichdi and Instant Khichdi. She has also worked in Mrs. Tendulkar.

Television dramas

Baa Bahoo Aur Baby

Bhadra plays the role of Mitali Thakkar where she is the daughter of Praveen Thakkar (Paresh Ganatra) and Praveena Thakkar (Vaishali Thakkar), sister of Mehul Thakkar (Devarsh Thakkar) and Chaitali Thakkar (Swini Khara). She plays the role of a very responsible girl unlike her elder brother and younger sister who always do mischievous things.

Khichdi/Instant Khichdi

She plays the role as the daughter of Praful Tulsidas Parekh (Rajeev Mehta) and Hansa Praful Parekh (Supriya Pathak). Unlike her parents, she is intelligent and she also has a catchphrase, "Bade Log Bade Log" (Oh! the elders, the elders!), which she repeats along with her cousin Jacky(Yash Mittal).

Mrs. Tendulkar

Bhadra plays the role of Mayuri Trivedi where she likes to do makeup and fashion. She is also a highly lazy person and is dependent on others to do her tasks for her and always dreams about running away from home to marry Prasad.

References

External links
Richa Bhadra On Twitter
Ric

ha Bhadra on IMDb

Indian television actresses
Year of birth missing (living people)
Living people
Actresses in Hindi television
21st-century Indian actresses